The year 1571 in science and technology included a number of events, some of which are listed here.

Mathematics
 François Viète begins publication of Francisci Vietaei Universalium inspectionum ad Canonem mathematicum liber singularis containing many trigonometric tables and formulas on the sine and cosine, and novel in using a decimal notation; publication continued until 1579.

Medicine
 Peder Sørensen publishes Idea medicinæ philosophicæ in Basel, asserting the superiority of the ideas of Paracelsus to those of Galen.

Technology
 1571 or 1572 – Jacques Besson publishes his popular comprehensive treatise on machines, Theatrum Instrumentorum.
 The first occurrence of the word theodolite is found in the surveying textbook A geometric practice named Pantometria by Leonard Digges, published posthumously by his son, Thomas.

Births
 December 9 – Metius, Dutch mathematician (died 1635)
 December 27 – Johannes Kepler, German astronomer (died 1630)
 Willem Blaeu, Dutch cartographer (died 1638)
 Frederick de Houtman, Dutch explorer (died 1627)

Deaths
 Bartolomeo Maranta, Italian physician and botanist (born c. 1500)

References

 
16th century in science
1570s in science